Charltona is a genus of moths of the family Crambidae. The genus was erected by Charles Swinhoe in 1886.

Description
Palpi porrect (extending forward), clothed with rough hair, and projecting about one and a half times the length of the head. Maxillary palpi triangularly dilated with hair. Frons rounded. Tibia with outer spurs about two-thirds length of inner. Wings long and narrow. Forewings with rectangular apex. Vein 3 from before angle of cell and veins 4 and 5 well separated at origin. Vein 7 straight and well separated with veins 8 and 9. Vein 10 free, whereas vein 11 curved and approximated to vein 12. Hindwings with vein 3 from near angle of cell. Veins 4 and 5 from angle and approximated for a short distance. Vein 6 absent and vein 7 anastomosing (fused) with vein 8.

Species
Charltona actinialis Hampson, 1919
Charltona albidalis Hampson, 1919
Charltona albimixtalis Hampson, 1919
Charltona argyrastis Hampson, 1919
Charltona ariadna Błeszyński, 1970
Charltona atrifascialis Hampson, 1919
Charltona bivitellus (Moore, 1872)
Charltona cervinellus (Moore, 1872) (including C. interruptellus, which may be distinct)
Charltona chrysopasta Hampson, 1910
Charltona cramboides (Walker, 1865)
Charltona desistalis (Walker, 1863)
Charltona diatraeella (Hampson, 1896)
Charltona endothermalis Hampson, 1919
Charltona fusca Hampson, 1903
Charltona inconspicuellus (Moore, 1872)
Charltona interstitalis Hampson, 1919
Charltona kala C. Swinhoe, 1886
Charltona laminata Hampson, 1896
Charltona ortellus (C. Swinhoe, 1887)
Charltona plurivittalis Hampson, 1910
Charltona rufalis Hampson, 1919
Charltona synaula Meyrick, 1933
Charltona trichialis (Hampson, 1903)
Charltona tritonella (Hampson, 1898)

Status unclear
Charltona consociellus (Walker, 1863)

References

Crambinae
Crambidae genera
Taxa named by Charles Swinhoe
Taxa described in 1886